The United States women's national under-23 volleyball team represents the United States in international women's volleyball competitions and friendly matches under the age 23 and it is ruled by the American Volleyball Federation USAV body That is an affiliate of the International Volleyball Federation FIVB and also a part of the North, Central America and Caribbean Volleyball Confederation NORCECA.

Results

FIVB U23 World Championship
 Champions   Runners up   Third place   Fourth place

U23 Pan American Cup
 Champions   Runners up   Third place   Fourth place

Team

Current Squad

References

External links
 www.usavolleyball.org

National women's under-23 volleyball teams
Volleyball in the United States
Volleyball